The following are the standings of the Iran Football's 2nd Division 1972–73 football season. In 1973 the Taj Ahvaz was promoted to the Takht Jamshid Cup, but league rules allowed for only one team of the same name to participate, therefore Taj Tehran, remained in the league, and Taj Ahvaz F.C. was forced to stay in the lower leagues.

League standings

Group A

Group B

Semifinals

Final

 Taj Ahvaz Promoted 1973–74 Takht Jamshid Cup

Third place play-off

See also
 1973–74 Takht Jamshid Cup

League 2 (Iran) seasons
2